Lists of governors of Virginia are lists of governors of the American state of Virginia. They include colonial governors before the United States declared independence, and governors since that date.

List of colonial governors of Virginia (1585–1775).
List of governors of Virginia, covers post-colonial governors (1775–present).